The Angat Watershed Forest Reserve is a conservation area that protects the drainage basin in the southern Sierra Madre range north of Metro Manila in the Philippines where surface water empties into the Angat River and its distributaries. The Angat Dam and Reservoir is also a major source of hydroelectricity for Metro Manila and surrounding provinces, contributing some 200 megawatts to the Luzon grid. The watershed is a popular birdwatching site and is a biodiversity hotspot containing most of the remaining closed-canopy forests in Central Luzon.

History
The Angat Watershed was first gazetted on July 26, 1904 as the Angat River Reserve through Executive Order No. 33 signed by Civil Governor Luke Edward Wright. It set aside the Angat River in the municipality of Norzagaray bordering Mounts Salacot, Balugan and Sulip in the Sierra Madre range and including the Bulagao and Bitbit creeks for purposes of the development of water power from the river. On March 10, 1927 through Proclamation No. 71 signed by Governor-General Leonard Wood, the  Angat Watershed Forest Reserve was established covering portions of the municipalities of Montalban, San José del Monte, Norzagaray, Angat, San Rafael, San Miguel, Peñaranda and Infanta in the provinces of Rizal, Bulacan, Nueva Ecija and Tayabas, with the administration and control placed under the Department of Agriculture and Natural Resources. At about this time, the Metropolitan Water District (now Metropolitan Waterworks and Sewerage System) started construction on the  Angat–Novaliches Water System including the Ipo Dam located within the reserve, which was completed in 1939 and inaugurated in 1940. On December 4, 1965, with the construction of the Angat Hydroelectric Dam within the protected area, President Diosdado Macapagal signed Proclamation No. 505 transferring the administration of the whole reserve to the National Power Corporation.

On April 30, 1968,  of land surrounding the Ipo Dam was declared as a separate forest range and watershed management pilot project reserve through Proclamation No. 391 issued by President Ferdinand Marcos. This declaration effectively excluded the southern section of the watershed from the control of the National Power Corporation and placed it instead under the joint administration and control of the Director of Forestry of the Department of Agriculture and Natural Resources and the General Manager of the Metropolitan Waterworks and Sewerage System.

Geography

It contains the headwaters of the Angat River, a tributary of the Rio Grande de Pampanga, and stretches along upper Angat River from San Jose del Monte and Rodriguez to Doña Remedios Trinidad, and extending to General Tinio and General Nakar. The forest reserve is divided into two sub-catchment areas: the Forest Range and the Metro Water District. It is under the administration of the Department of Environment and Natural Resources and Metropolitan Waterworks and Sewerage System. The Angat Hydropower Corporation, a joint venture of San Miguel Corporation and K-water, has managed the reserve since taking over ownership of the hydroelectric power plant from the National Power Corporation in 2014.

The watershed is characterized by hilly to mountainous topography and a moderate to intensive forest cover. It is considered as one of the few remaining well-forested and well-managed watersheds in the country.
It also contains Mount Maranat, a popular destination for hikers and is also visited for its waterfalls. These mountains in the southern Sierra Madre range feed the Angat River's water source from its three major tributaries: the Talaguio, Catmon and Matulid Rivers.

The reserve is home to an indigenous population known as Dumagat tribe which inhabit twelve sitios in the villages of San Mateo, San Lorenzo and San Isidro in Norzagaray, and Kabayunan in Doña Remedios Trinidad. In December 2014, the National Power Corporation inaugurated the Angat Rainforest and Ecological Park within the reserve in Sitio Bitbit, San Lorenzo, Norzagaray. It offers many different opportunities for nature and outdoors enthusiasts including the hilltop view deck, ecological center, and the Tarictic fun trail. A museum of natural history is also planned for the park, as well as a Dumagat cultural heritage site, seedling propagation, rattan gene bank and a bambusetum.

The Upper Marikina River Basin Protected Landscape borders Angat Watershed on the south, while on the north, it is also contiguous with the  Doña Remedios–General Tinio Watershed Forest Reserve. It is also bordered by the Biak-na-Bato National Park and Minalungao National Park on the west and northwest. It is accessible from Manila via Quirino Highway, Del Monte–Norzagaray Road and Bigti–San Mateo Road in Norzagaray.

Biodiversity
The Angat Watershed supports a variety of wildlife thanks to its location in the Sierra Madre and its rich hydrology and terrestrial ecology coated by lowland dipterocarp forests, submontane forests, grasslands, secondary bamboo and scrublands. It is home to 290 endemic species of woody and non-woody plants, including the white lauan (known locally as bagtikan), tanguile, yakal, acacia and narra. A good area for bird-watching, the Angat reserve attracts 43 different bird species, many of which are threatened or restricted. In addition to the two most visible birds in the reserve, the Luzon hornbill (known locally as kalao) and the Rufous hornbill, the reserve also attracts large flocks of spotted imperial pigeon, scale-feathered malkoha, rough-crested malkoha, grey-backed tailorbird, and Philippine eagle owl. These avian species are all endemic to the Philippines, with the Luzon hornbill and Philippine eagle-owl classified as near-threatened and vulnerable. The data-deficient Worcester's buttonquail has also been recorded in the watershed, as well as the Philippine hawk-eagle, Philippine dwarf kingfisher, green racket-tail, whiskered pitta, celestial monarch, ashy thrush, ashy-breasted flycatcher, flame-breasted fruit dove, and green-faced parrotfinch.

Two near-threatened mammals are known to roam the watershed forest at Angat, the crab-eating macaque and the Philippine warty pig. It is also a known habitat of the Philippine deer. Other rare species of note in the protected area include the blazed Luzon shrew rat, and 66 species of vertebrates, including the endemic Japanese bullet frog and marbled water monitor. The Angat reservoir is stocked with huge tilapia and eel.

References

Protected areas of the Sierra Madre (Philippines)
Geography of Bulacan
Geography of Rizal
Geography of Nueva Ecija
Geography of Quezon
Protected areas established in 1904
Protected areas established in 1927
Protected areas established in 1968
Tourist attractions in Bulacan
Birdwatching sites in the Philippines
Forest reserves of the Philippines
1904 establishments in the Philippines
1927 establishments in the Philippines
1968 establishments in the Philippines